Poesias Para Gael is a 2017 Brazilian LGBT drama film, produced by Telemilênio Brasil.

Plot
Gael is gay and is being bullied at school. Eline is in love with him but as he does not respond to her, she starts to hate him and to interfere in his life. She then decides to devise a plan to make Gael suffer  - she puts it to Hugo who is his friend to abandon Gael, but what she did not expect was that the two of them would be together. So the villain decides to take revenge on both of them. The version made available for free on the production channel Telemilênio on YouTube, has more than 4 million views.

Cast
 Victor Neves as Gael  
 Flávio Leimig as Hugo  
 Natalie Smith as Eline
 Magda Resende as Helena
 Luciano Santos as Renato
 Valma Christina as Virginia Valquíria
 Ian Tavares as Paulo
 Allexandre Colman as Gael kid 
 Duda Wendling as Eline kid
 Rafael Sun as Hugo kid
 Priscila Cardoso as Josiane
 Arthur Gregory as Miguel
 Joel Viana as Pai de Gael
 Jonas Freze as Rafael

References

External links
 

2017 films
Brazilian drama films
Brazilian LGBT-related films
2017 directorial debut films
2017 drama films
2017 LGBT-related films
2010s Portuguese-language films